The Asan Award in Medicine (frequently written as ASAN Award in Medicine) is an annual medical award presented by the Asan Foundation (ko). Not to be confused with their other prize, the ASAN Award, which is given for volunteer work, nor the Asan Memorial Poetry Prize given by the Asan Memorial Association in memory of Malayalam poet Kumaran Asan. Established in 2007, the Asan Award in Medicine is presented in the categories of Basic Medicine, Clinical Medicine, and Young Medical Scientists who are under the age of 40. For the first five years there was a singular laureate but now there is laureate for basic and clinical and up to three young scientists laureates.

History
Raised in 2013 to encourage medical research, prize money for the first two categories is 300 million KRW, and for found scientists it is 50 million KRW each. While the Foundation's website mentions the award is given to "medical scientists devoting themselves to the country’s medical development", the Award's website mentions the honor can be presented to medical scientists of any citizenship who "have made contributions to the development of Korea's medical science." International recipients receive their prize money in 250,000 USD.

Recipients
The award has been given to the following individuals.

See also
 Asan Medical Center
 Gangneung Asan Hospital
 Ho-Am Prize in Medicine

References

External links
 Asan Foundation

South Korean awards
Awards established in 2007
2007 establishments in South Korea